2011 Virginia Cavaliers baseball team represented the University of Virginia in the 2011 NCAA Division I baseball season.  The Cavaliers played their home games at Davenport Field. The team was coached by Brian O'Connor, leading his eighth season at Virginia.

The Cavaliers won the Atlantic Coast Conference Coastal Division and the 2011 Atlantic Coast Conference baseball tournament, then advanced to the 2011 College World Series as the top overall seed.  They fell to eventual champion South Carolina in the semifinal.

Personnel

Roster

Coaches

Schedule

Ranking movements

References

Virginia Cavaliers baseball seasons
Virginia
Atlantic Coast Conference baseball champion seasons
College World Series seasons
Virginia
Virgin